Skiron may refer to:
The northwesterly wind in ancient Greek mythology, see Anemoi
Scirum, a town in ancient Attica, Greece